Monochroa is a genus of moths in the family Gelechiidae.

Species
Monochroa absconditella (Walker, 1864)
Monochroa agatha (Meyrick, 1918)
Monochroa ainella (Chrétien, 1908)
Monochroa angustipennella (Clemens, 1863)
Monochroa arundinetella (Stainton, 1858)
Monochroa bronzella Karsholt, Nel, Fournier, Varenne & Huemer, 2013
Monochroa chromophanes (Meyrick, 1938)
Monochroa cleodora (Meyrick, 1935)
Monochroa cleodoroides Sakamaki, 1994
Monochroa conspersella (Herrich-Schäffer, 1854)
Monochroa cytisella (Curtis, 1837)
Monochroa dellabeffai (Rebel, 1932)
Monochroa disconotella (Chambers, 1878)
Monochroa discriminata (Meyrick, 1923)
Monochroa divisella (Douglas, 1850)
Monochroa drosocrypta (Meyrick, 1926)
Monochroa elongella (Heinemann, 1870)
Monochroa ferrea (Frey, 1870)
Monochroa fervidella (Mann, 1864)
Monochroa fragariae (Busck, 1919)
Monochroa gilvolinella (Clemens, 1863)
Monochroa gracilella (Chrétien, 1908)
Monochroa harrisonella (Busck, 1904)
Monochroa hornigi (Staudinger, 1883)
Monochroa inflexella Svensson, 1992
Monochroa ingravata (Meyrick, 1918)
Monochroa japonica Sakamaki, 1996
Monochroa kumatai Sakamaki, 1996
Monochroa leptocrossa (Meyrick, 1926)
Monochroa lucidella (Stephens, 1834)
Monochroa lutulentella (Zeller, 1839)
Monochroa melagonella (Constant, 1895)
Monochroa monactis (Meyrick, 1923)
Monochroa moyses Uffen, 1991
Monochroa niphognatha (Gozmány, 1953)
Monochroa nomadella (Zeller, 1868)
Monochroa pallida Sakamaki, 1996
Monochroa palustrella (Douglas, 1850)
Monochroa parvulata (Gozmany, 1953)
Monochroa pentameris (Meyrick, 1931)
Monochroa perterrita (Meyrick, 1923)
Monochroa pessocrossa (Meyrick, 1926)
Monochroa placidella (Zeller, 1874)
Monochroa plusia (Caradja, 1920)
Monochroa pullusella (Chambers, 1874)
Monochroa quinquepunctella (Busck, 1903)
Monochroa rebeli (M. Hering, 1927)
Monochroa repudiata (Meyrick, 1923)
Monochroa robusta (Braun, 1921)
Monochroa rufulella (Snellen, 1884)
Monochroa rumicetella (Hofmann, 1868)
Monochroa rutilella (Snellen, 1884)
Monochroa saltenella (Benander, 1928)
Monochroa scutatella (Müller-Rutz, 1920)
Monochroa sepicolella (Herrich-Schäffer, 1854)
Monochroa servella (Zeller, 1839)
Monochroa simplicella (Lienig & Zeller, 1846)
Monochroa sperata Huemer & Karsholt, 2010
Monochroa subcostipunctella Sakamaki, 1996
Monochroa suffusella (Douglas, 1850)
Monochroa tenebrella (Hübner, 1817)
Monochroa tetragonella (Stainton, 1885)
Monochroa uralensis Junnilainen, 2010

Status unclear
Monochroa decolorella (Herrich-Schäffer, 1854), described as Anacampsia decolorella from Austria. Synonym: Doryphora luteella Heinemann, 1870
Monochroa griseella (Heinemann, 1870), described as Doryphora griseella from Switzerland.
Monochroa rhenanella (Heyden, 1863), described as Gelechia rhenanella from Germany.

Selected former species
Monochroa csornensis (Rebel, 1909)
Monochroa nigromaculella (Millière, 1872)

References

 , 2000: New records of gelechiid moths from the Southern Siberia with description of three new species. Beiträge zur Entomologie 50 (2): 385-395.
 , 2010: A new endemic species of Monochroa from the south-western Alps (Lepidoptera: Gelechiidae). Zeitschrift de Arbeitsgemeinschaft der Österreichischen Entomologen 62: 81-86.
 ; ;  2009: Checklist of Gelechiidae (Lepidoptera) in America North of Mexico. Zootaxa, 2231: 1-39. Abstract & excerpt
 , 2010: The gelechiid fauna of the southern Ural Mountains, part I: descriptions of seventeen new species (Lepidoptera: Gelechiidae). Zootaxa 2366: 1-34. Abstract: http://www.mapress.com/zootaxa/2010/f/z02366p034f.pdf].
 , 2010: New find of the Subfamily Anomologinae (Lepidoptera, Gelechiidae) from the Primorsky district. Amurian zoological journal II(1): 52-56. (in Russian) Full article: .
 , 1994: Monochroa cleodora (MEYRICK), comb. n. (Lepidoptera, Gelechiidae) and its Allied New Species from Japan. Japanese Journal of Entomology 62 (1): 167-174. Full article: .
 , 1996: Notes on Japanese Species of the Genus Monochroa with Descriptions of Two New Species (Lepidoptera, Gelechiidae). Japanese journal of entomology 64(2): 245-254. Full article: .

External links
Monochroa at funet

 
Isophrictini